The 40th Annual Tony Awards ceremony was held on June 1, 1986, at the Minskoff Theatre and was broadcast by CBS television.

The ceremony
The opening number was "Wanna Sing A Show Tune". The special number was "Forty Years of Broadway Show Music", which included songs from musicals including Annie, Big River, Finian's Rainbow, Hello, Dolly!, Fiddler on the Roof, La Cage aux Folles, and Sweet Charity. The finale was the company singing "Give My Regards to Broadway".

There were also vignettes from past Tony Award-winning  plays.

The presenters and performers were: Debbie Allen, Susan Anton, Bea Arthur, Nell Carter, Agnes de Mille, José Ferrer, Sandy Duncan, Phyllis Frelich, Helen Hayes, Michael Kidd, Cleo Laine, Jack Lemmon, Hal Linden, John V. Lindsay, Dorothy Loudon, Karen Morrow, Bernadette Peters, Stefanie Powers, Juliet Prowse, Tony Randall, Lee Roy Reams, Ann Reinking, Lee Remick, Alfonso Ribeiro, Chita Rivera, John Rubinstein, Rex Smith, Marlo Thomas, Leslie Uggams, Lily Tomlin, Sam Waterston, Ben Vereen, David Wayne, Tom Wopat.

Musicals that performed were Big Deal ("Beat Me Daddy Eight to the Bar" - Company); Song & Dance ("Unexpected Song" - Bernadette Peters); Tango Argentino (Dance Excerpts - Company); and The Mystery of Edwin Drood ("There You Are"/"Don't Quit While You're Ahead" - George Rose and Company).

Winners and nominees
Winners are in bold

Special award
 Regional Theatre Award - American Repertory Theater, Cambridge, Massachusetts

Multiple nominations and awards

These productions had multiple nominations:

11 nominations: The Mystery of Edwin Drood
8 nominations: The House of Blue Leaves and Song and Dance   
5 nominations: Big Deal, Loot and Sweet Charity
4 nominations: The Iceman Cometh and Long Day's Journey into Night 
3 nominations: I'm Not Rappaport and Tango Argentino
2 nominations: Benefactors, Hay Fever, The Marriage of Figaro, The Petition, Singin' in the Rain and Wind in the Willows

The following productions received multiple awards.

5 wins: The Mystery of Edwin Drood 
4 wins: The House of Blue Leaves and Sweet Charity 
3 wins: I'm Not Rappaport

See also
 Drama Desk Awards
 1986 Laurence Olivier Awards – equivalent awards for West End theatre productions
 Obie Award
 New York Drama Critics' Circle
 Theatre World Award
 Lucille Lortel Awards

References

External links
Tony Awards official site

Tony Awards ceremonies
1986 in theatre
1986 theatre awards
Tony
1986 in New York City